Tosaka (written: 登坂 or 戸坂) is a Japanese surname. Notable people with the surname include:

, Japanese sport wrestler
, Japanese singer and actor
, Japanese philosopher

See also
Tōsaka

Japanese-language surnames